Liliane is a given name for women, most often used where French is spoken, a variant of Lillian and Lily.

People with this name
Liliane Ackermann (1938–2007), French writer of a Jewish family
Liliane Bettencourt (1922–2017), the second richest person in France
Liliane Chappuis (1955–2007), Swiss politician
Liliane de Kermadec (1928–2020), French film director and screenwriter
Liliane Klein-Lieber (1924–2020), French resistance member
Liliane Maury Pasquier (born 1956), Swiss politician
Liliane Montevecchi (1932–2018), French actress, dancer, and singer
Liliane Nemri, Lebanese actress
Liliane Saint-Pierre (born 1948), Belgian singer
Leelee Sobieski (born 1983, real name Liliane), American actress

External links
Liliane at thinkbabynames.com

Feminine given names
French feminine given names